Latrodectus elegans is a species of black widow spider, found in South Asia, Southeast Asia and East Asia. It was first collected by the Swedish arachnologist Tamerlan Thorell in the Karen Hills in Myanmar, but is also found in Thailand, India, Nepal, Vietnam, China and Japan. , the World Spider Catalog only lists  India, Nepal, Myanmar, China and Japan. This species has only been recorded in India and Nepal since 2012, and Indochina in 2015, which is thought to reflect historical under-surveying of arachnids in this region. 

In 2022 a chromosome-scale reference genome was sequenced from specimens from Yunnan, producing a 1.57 Gb sized genome with 14 chromosomes. Annotating this there were found to be 20,167 protein-coding genes, including 55 toxin and 26 spidroin (spider silk) genes.

References 

elegans
Spiders described in 1898
Spiders of Asia